The Transwa WDA/WDB/WDC and WEA/WEB classes are two classes of railcars built by United Goninan, Broadmeadow for Transwa in 2004-2005 to replace the WAGR WCA/WCE class railcars on the AvonLink, MerredinLink and Prospector services in Western Australia.

History 
In December 2000, Westrail awarded a contract to United Goninan, Broadmeadow for nine railcars to replace the 1971 built WAGR WCA/WCE class railcars. Seven were for The Prospector service and two were for the AvonLink and MerredinLink services. One of the WDC railcars suffered an electrical fault in one of the air conditioning system which caused the railcar to catch fire. The railcar was overhauled and put back into service, some warping of the metal panel work still visible on the railcar to this day.

These consist of three WDA driving cars, three WDB driving cars without buffet, and one motored WDC non-driving car. These form two two-car sets and one three-car set. The AvonLink set consists of one WEA and WEB railcar and has a different design of seat, but doesn't have the entertainment system or buffet that The Prospector has.

References

External links 

Diesel multiple units of Western Australia
Prospector rail service
High-speed rail in Australia